Vidharth is an Indian actor, appearing in Tamil films. He started his career in 2001 doing uncredited roles. His first major role was in  Mynaa (2010), which became a huge success. He has also done a film for AVM Productions titled Mudhal Idam (2011).

Career

Vidharth joined the drama troupe, Koothu-P-Pattarai through some of his friends and began learning the nuances of acting step by step and made his on screen debut with a small role in Gautham Vasudev Menon's Minnale (2001). Despite believing that the small role would bring him more offers, it did not, and Vidharth continued small-time work with his drama troupe. After ten years,  Prabhu solomon cast him in small role in his films, Kokki (2006), Lee (2007) and Laadam (2009), after seeing him in action in Koothupattarai.

Vidharth collaborated with Prabhu Solomon again, who gave him the lead role in his romantic drama Mynaa (2010). The film became the biggest success of Vidharth's career. He starred in AVM Productions' 175th production Mudhal Idam (2011). In Kollaikaran (2012), he played the role of a criminal. He also played alongside Parthiban and Vimal in Jannal Oram (2013) directed by Karu Pazhaniappan. In 2014, he had five releases, the most in a year in his career. He first acted alongside Ajith Kumar in the masala film Veeram. Venmegam was his next release, which was said to be about the bond between an artist, played by Vidharth, and a school girl (played by Jayashree Sivadas). He then played a mini bus driver named Velpandiyan in S. P. Rajkumar's romantic comedy Pattaya Kelappanum Pandiya. His other releases that year were Aal, a remake of the Hindi film Aamir and reportedly the first Tamil film to be shot in Sikkim at the India-China border, and Kaadu, a film based on the subject of deforestation. With regard to Kaadu, The New Indian Express wrote that it had Vidharth's "most inspired performance post Myna".

In 2016, he had a psychological crime thriller starring Kuttrame Thandanai. After Mynaa, this is the career best of Vidharth as he perfectly emotes as the tunnel vision protagonist. In 2017, his films like Oru Kidayin Karunai Manu and Kurangu Bommai have been successful. Subsequently, he played supporting roles in  Magalir Mattum, Vizhithiru and Kodiveeran. He played the role of Jyothika's husband in  Radha Mohan's Kaatrin Mozhi (2018). He has received a positive response from the audience. His next films was Vandi (2018) and Chithiram Pesuthadi 2 (2019).

Personal life
Vidharth married Gayathri Devi in June 2015 and they have a daughter born in 2017.

Filmography
Films

Television
Malargal (2005)

References

External links 
 

Living people
People from Tamil Nadu
Male actors in Tamil cinema
Indian male film actors
1979 births